Hangar 1: The UFO Files is an American documentary TV series that premiered on February 28, 2014 on H2. It was produced by Go Go Luckey Productions.

The Mutual UFO Network (MUFON) provides files from their archives of UFO sightings as the basis for episodes of Hangar 1.

Episodes
Color Key

Season 1 (2014)
Season 1 started on February 28, 2014 on H2 Channel in North America.

Season 2 (2015)
Season 2 started on April 10, 2015.

International broadcast
The series premiered in Australia on June 11, 2015 on the Australian version of The History Channel.

See also
 List of topics characterized as pseudoscience
 Ancient Aliens
 UFO Files
 Unidentified flying object (UFO)

References

External links
 
 

2010s American documentary television series
2014 American television series debuts
A&E (TV network) original programming
UFO-related television